Ganga Ki Vachan is a Hindi action film of Bollywood directed by Gulshan Ashte and produced by Manisha Vimal. This movie was released on 12 June 1992 under the banner of Vardan Films.

Plot
Ganga, an ill-fated girl joined in a dacoit gang after refusal of her husband. She falls in love with Vikram, leader of the gang and marries him. Another dacoit leader Thakur Dayalu Singh kills Vikram. Ganga oaths to avenge the murder of Vikram.

Cast
 Upasana Singh as Ganga
 Siddharth Ray as Vikram
 Shakti Kapoor as Khan
 Kader Khan as Shastriji
 Gulshan Grover as Barju
 Avtar Gill as Avtar Singh
 Mangal Dhillon as Thakur Dayalu Singh
 Mahavir Shah as Bhima

Soundtrack
Alka Yagnik and Udit Narayan were the main singers of this film. Music is given by Nikhil-Vinay 

Songs
 Chham Chham - Alka Yagnik 
 Dharti Tujh Par Naaz Kare - Udit Narayan
 Dhum Dhum - Udit Narayan
 Dilbar Janiya - Udit Narayan
 Meri Neend Kahin - Udit Narayan, Alka Yagnik
 Satrangi Chudiyan - Alka Yagnik
 Chandi Ki Chhappedar - Alka Yagnik

References

External links
 

1992 films
1992 action films
1990s Hindi-language films
Indian action films
Hindi-language action films
Indian films about revenge
Films about outlaws